Maurice Goldberg (1881–1949) was a Russian Empire-born painter and photographer who emigrated to the United States and became a noted portrait photographer. A collection of his work is in the Margaret Herrick Library of the Institute of art and photography.

References

External links 

1881 births
1949 deaths
Emigrants from the Russian Empire to the United States
Painters from the Russian Empire
Photographers from the Russian Empire